Daveson is a rural locality in the Cassowary Coast Region, Queensland, Australia.

Daveson is a prominent farming town that grows large fields of sugar cane. Daveson is also home to many cattle farms.  The town name is derived from the Daveson family.

References 

Cassowary Coast Region
Localities in Queensland